Future User are an American rock band from Los Angeles, California, formed in 2013, consisting of bass guitarist Tim Commerford (formerly of Rage Against the Machine and Audioslave), multi-instrumentalist Jordan Tarlow and drummer Jon Knox. They describe their music as "Progtronic", combining electronic music with progressive rock. They have released one album, SteroidsOrHeroin, in 2015.

Background 

Tim Commerford formed Future User along with Jordan Tarlow, a multi-instrumentalist who plays keyboards and does the programming of the music. The tandem teamed up with Commerford's lifelong friend, session drummer Jon Knox and Rage Against the Machine/Audioslave producer Brendan O'Brien who played guitars on the album.

On September 1, 2014, the band released their first video "Clockwork" where Commerford, disguised as the persona 'S.W.I.M.' subjects former tennis star John McEnroe to waterboarding. comic book writer, editor and publisher Stan Lee makes a brief cameo in their second video, "Supernatural". "Mountain Lion" features cyclist Lance Armstrong as well as a voice message from Armstrong challenging Commerford to a personal cycling contest. Commerford also performs a blood transfusion and injects a PED in the video. When he reveals himself in the final part of the video, he lights himself on fire.

Their debut album, SteroidsOrHeroin, was released through the iTunes Store on February 24, 2015
and was mixed by LA Engineer Tom Syrowski.

To celebrate Record Store Day on April 18, 2015, the band released a limited edition 12-inch vinyl version of the album. Commerford used his own blood to help color the 180-gram red-colored vinyl. There is also a limited edition clear vinyl version of the disc available.

The video for "Voodoo Juju", which was inspired by a real-life accident of Commerford's, shows him undergoing spinal surgery, with good friend and bandmate Tom Morello playing a greedy doctor and Rush members Geddy Lee and Alex Lifeson featured as Canadian doctors. The video contrasts the for-profit American healthcare system with the universal Canadian healthcare system.

Band members
 Tim Commerford – lead vocals, bass guitar (2013–present)
 Jordan Tarlow – keyboards, programming (2013–present)
 Jon Knox – drums (2013–present)

Studio
 Brendan O'Brien – guitar (2014)

Discography
SteroidsOrHeroin (2015)

References

External links
 
 
 Future User at Discogs

Progressive rock musical groups from California
American electronic rock musical groups
American musical trios
Musical groups from Los Angeles
Musical groups established in 2013
2013 establishments in California